Dilawar Mani born in Rawalpindi, Pakistan, is the chief executive officer of Emirates Cricket Board (ECB), the ICC-authorised regulatory authority of UAE cricket. He is the brother of former ICC (International Cricket Council) president and current Chairman of Pakistan Cricket Board Ehsan Mani.

References 

Year of birth missing (living people)
Living people
People from Rawalpindi
Pakistani cricket administrators
Pakistani expatriates in the United Arab Emirates